Children of Nature is a 1991 Icelandic film directed by Friðrik Þór Friðriksson. It was nominated for the Best Foreign Language Film Oscar at the 64th Academy Awards, the only Icelandic film to have ever been nominated.

Plot 
Þorgeir, an old man living in the Icelandic countryside, has grown too old to continue running his farm, and is made to feel unwelcome in his daughter and son-in-law's urban dwelling. Dumped into a home for the elderly in Reykjavík, he meets an old girlfriend from his youth, and they elope to the wilds of Iceland to die together.

See also 
 List of submissions to the 64th Academy Awards for Best Foreign Language Film
 List of Icelandic submissions for the Academy Award for Best Foreign Language Film

References

External links 
 
 

Icelandic romantic drama films
1990s Icelandic-language films
1991 films
1991 romantic drama films
Films directed by Friðrik Þór Friðriksson
Films scored by Hilmar Örn Hilmarsson